Indian Creek is a stream located entirely within Ritchie County, West Virginia. It is a tributary of Hughes River.

Indian Creek was named after the Indians (Native Americans) who once dwelled in the area.

See also
List of rivers of West Virginia

References

Rivers of Ritchie County, West Virginia
Rivers of West Virginia